This list is of the Historic Sites of Japan located within the Prefecture of Shizuoka.

National Historic Sites
As of 1 January 2021, forty-eight Sites have been designated as being of national significance (including three *Special Historic Sites); the Joseon Mission Sites span the borders with Hiroshima and Okayama, Old Hakone Road and the site of the Stone Quarries for Edo Castle span the border with Kanagawa, and Mount Fuji spans the border with Yamanashi.

Prefectural Historic Sites
As of 1 May 2020, thirty-four Sites have been designated as being of prefectural importance.

Municipal Historic Sites
As of 1 May 2020, a further two hundred and eighty-five Sites have been designated as being of municipal importance.

See also

 Cultural Properties of Japan
 Tōtōmi, Suruga, and Izu Provinces
 List of Places of Scenic Beauty of Japan (Shizuoka)
 List of Cultural Properties of Japan - historical materials (Shizuoka)
 List of Cultural Properties of Japan - paintings (Shizuoka)

References

External links
  Cultural Properties in Shizuoka Prefecture

Shizuoka Prefecture
 Shizuoka